Trese  is a Singaporean anime-influenced streaming television series based on the Filipino comic series of the same name by Budjette Tan and Kajo Baldisimo. Produced by BASE Entertainment, the series was released on June 10, 2021 on Netflix in the United States, which was followed by a global release the next day.

Characters

Main
Alexandra Trese
Voiced by: Shay Mitchell (English), Liza Soberano (Tagalog), Ryoko Shiraishi (Japanese)
A healer-warrior who serves as a protector of humanity from supernatural beings from the underworld. Soberano, more known for doing live action roles, was initially hesitant on doing the role of Alexandra remarking that "voice acting is a different game from acting". In contrast to dubbing her own films and commercials, Soberano added that she had to portray a "new character" instead of being her own "natural self". Shay Mitchell, on her part, described her role in the English dub as "super fun, but intense". Mitchell also had to recite some lines in Tagalog, a language she has said she is familiar with but not fluent in. She worked with a dialect coach before to each voice over session via Zoom.

Rudolf Baldonado coached Soberano to modulate and lower the pitch of her voice for her role. She also had to work on her accent when speaking Tagalog. Steffi Graf Bontogon-Mola also voices Alexandra's younger self. Meanwhile, Satomi Kobayashi dubs Alexandra's younger self in Japanese.
The Kambal / Crispin and Basilio
Voiced by: Griffin Puatu (English), Simon dela Cruz (Filipino), Yoshihisa Hosokawa (Japanese)
Twins who serve as Alexandra's bodyguards and are collectively known as the Kambal (Twins).
Captain Guerrero
Voiced by: Matt Yang King (English), Apollo Abraham (Filipino), Ken Uo (Japanese)
Hank
Voiced by: Jon Jon Briones (English), Christopher Carlo Caling (Filipino), Yūki Sanpei (Japanese)
Anton Trese 
Voiced by: Carlos Alazraqui (English), Eugene Adalia (Filipino), Ken Yanai (Japanese)
Alexandra's father.

Others
Miranda Trese
Voiced by: Nicole Scherzinger (English), Cheska Aguiluz (Filipino), Kiyoko Yonekura (Japanese)
Maliksi
Voiced by: Manny Jacinto (English), Steve dela Cruz (Filipino) 
Bagyon Kulimlim
Voiced by: Dante Basco (English), Jose Amado Santiago (Filipino), Takashi Uezumiya (Japanese)
Bagyon Lektro
Voiced by: Eric Bauza (English), Christopher Carlo Caling (Filipino), Yuki Tamai (Japanese)
Ibwa
Voiced by: Steve Blum (English), Elyrey Martin (Filipino)
Nuno
Voiced by: Eric Bauza (English), Christian Velarde (Filipino), Hironori Saito (Japanese)
Marco Guerrero
Voiced by: Darren Criss (English), Jose Amado Santiago (Filipino), Noriyuki Tsuyuki (Japanese)
Mayor Sancho Santamaria
Voiced by: Lou Diamond Phillips (English), Rene Tandoc (Filipino), Yasuhiro Kikuchi (Japanese)
Bantay
Voiced by: Griffin Puatu (English), Masashi Hashimoto (Japanese)
Puti
Voiced by: Yasuhiro Kikuchi (Japanese)
Young Crispin/Basilio
Voiced by: Ratana (English)
Santelmo
Voiced by: Carlos Alazraqui (English), R.J. Celdran (Filipino), Noriyuki Tsuyuki (Japanese)
Lieutenant Tapia
Voiced by: Takashi Uezumi (Japanese)
Woman reporter
Voiced by: Deedee Magno Hall (English), Satomi Kobayashi (Japanese)
Reyes
Voiced by: Masashi Hashimoto (Japanese)
Emissary
Voiced by: Deedee Magno Hall (English), Jo Anne Orobia-Chu (Filipino), Riho Sugiyama (Japanese)
Amie
Voiced by: Tania Gunadi (English), Satomi Kobayashi (Japanese)
Hannah
Voiced by: Tania Gunadi (English), Riho Sugiyama (Japanese)
Dominic
Voiced by: Yang King (English), Elyrey Martin (Filipino)
Coleen
Voiced by: Momoe Touko (Japanese)
Amang Paso
Voiced by: Yasuhiro Kikuchi (Japanese)
Nova Aurora
Voiced by: Leslie-Anne Huff (English), Momoe Touko (Japanese)
Jobert*
Voiced by: Jeff Manabat (English)
Dr. Petra Gallaga
Voiced by: Ratana (English), Satomi Kobayashi (Japanese)
Raul Lazaro
Voiced by: Yuki Tamai (Japanese dub)
Ramona
Voiced by: Sumalee Montano (English), Rica Rojo (Filipino), Kiyoko Yonekura (Japanese)
Colonel Hidalgo
Voiced by: Reuben Uy (English)
General Villar
Voiced by: Earl Baylon (English)
Datu Talagbusao
Voiced by: Steve Blum (English), Bryan Allan Encarnacion (Filipino), Atsuki Tani (Japanese)

Production
The series was first announced in November 2018, with Jay Oliva as executive producer and director. Other directors will include David Hartman, Mel Zwyer, and Tim Divar. The series is written by Zig Marasigan, Mihk Vergara and Tanya Yuson. Yuson also serves as executive producer for BASE Entertainment with Shanty Harmayn. The series was produced by BASE Entertainment (from Singapore) and animated by Tiger Animation (from South Korea) and Lex+Otis Animation (from the United States). At the Netflix Anime Festival in October 2020, it was revealed that Trese komik artist Kajo Baldisimo and writer Budjette Tan will serve as showrunners.

In 2009, Tanya Yuson was looking for material to adapt for a series or film. She picked up Trese, the graphic novel, following a recommendation. Yuson forwarded the comic to her fellow producer Shanty Harmayn who convinced her that they should pitch the adaptation of Trese into an animated series. They pitched to both production studios within and outside the Philippines; with Netflix Anime agreeing to adapt Trese. In May 2018 Netflix reach out to Jay Oliva, who was based in the United States at the time, to work with a potential Trese animated series. Oliva accepted the role to be Treses director a month later. A copy of the Trese comics was sent to Oliva, who started working on the series while in his flight to Manila from the United States.

Oliva tried to balance out the Trese animated series to satisfy the existing fanbase and those who were not familiar with the original source material. He intended to retain the source material's central theme of "family and duty" which he describe are "universal ideas and very Filipino".

Three separate dubbings for Filipino, English, and Japanese were made for Trese. In non-Filipino versions, some Filipino dialogue, such as the phrase "tabi tabi po" were used to retain the series' "Pinoy" flavor and encourage foreigners to learn the Filipino language and culture. Among the three dubbings, English was the dubbing that was done first with the Filipino dubbing had to be based on the English version.

Writing
Trese was adapted from the first three volumes of the comics. Originally intended to be standalone by the source material's creators, the series was written in a way that connects the three volumes into one single arc.

Marketing
Trese'''s marketing promotions have been praised online, including praise for billboards on EDSA and other major streets in the Philippines that include a unique design style to make the billboards appear to have been vandalized or torn. This garnered a great deal of attention from Filipinos on social media, Twitter and Facebook. A popular newspaper in the Philippines, Philippine Star, also put "Trese" on its front page according to their official Twitter account, and Business World (a business newspaper in the Philippines) also put out a major advertisement. The media giant ABS-CBN, also promoted the show by replacing the logo outside their ABS-CBN Broadcasting Center headquarters  in Quezon City with the logo of Netflix's Trese series counterpart, ABC-ZNN, a fictitious media company used in the show. ABS-CBN also lit up their ELJ Communications Center building in Quezon City with the word Trese written on their facade.

Music
Kevin Kiner's sons Sean and Dean Kiner composed the musical score for Trese. Filipino band UDD performed the theme song of Trese entitled "Paagi" (translates from Visayan for "excuse me"). The song which served as the ending song was written in the middle of the COVID-19 pandemic in 2020. The production of the song took place in two phases. Paul Yap, Ean Mayor and Carlos Tanada did the first demo recording at the Wonder Collab Studios after which it was sent to Armi Millare for finalization. Millare revised the "Paagi"'s lyrics and Emil Dela Rosa did the remix and master of the song. Director Oliva characterized the song as "contemporary music but with Filipino instruments".

Episodes

ReleaseTrese was made available for viewing on the online platform starting June 10, 2021 in the United States, followed by the Philippines on June 11. The release featured six episodes covering storylines from the comic's first three volumes. The show was released in three languages, Filipino, English, and Japanese; with each version having its own set of cast.

At Netflix's virtual "Geeked Week" livestream on June 9, the first five minutes of Treses episode was previewed.

ReceptionTrese was in the top 10 TV shows list on Netflix in 19 countries as of June 13, 2021, ranking highest in the following countries: Philippines (#1), Qatar (#3), United Arab Emirates (#4), and Jamaica (#5). Other countries where the show ranked were Austria, Bangladesh, Bulgaria, Canada, Estonia, Germany, Kuwait, Lithuania, New Zealand, Nigeria, Oman, Serbia, Singapore, Sri Lanka, and the United States. The series became the highest ranked show on Netflix in the Philippines on the weekend following its premiere date.

Director Jay Oliva was told by Netflix that Trese is "really strong" and reliant on the Philippine market with Oliva expressing possibilities for "multiple seasons" if Trese continues to receive positive reception.

In a review for Rabbit Hole, Shaun Tan wrote that the show "captures the urban grittiness of Manila." He praised the plot, dialogue, animation, and voice acting, calling it "a paranormal Filipino film noir that is both stylish and gripping."

In the online anthropology magazine SAPIENS, Andrea Malaya M. Ragragio and Myfel D. Paluga noted that the show's portrayal of Talagbusao as "a bloodthirsty, male “god of war” whose nature is to wreak havoc and thrive in it" drew largely from American colonial era anthropologist Fay-Cooper Cole's description of him as a “patron of the warriors and of people who run amuck,” which dates back to the early 1900s. As a result, they say that " the Talagbusao depicted in Trese barely resembled what Indigenous communities in Mindanao mean when they talk about this entity or its related forms, called busaw''." But Ragragio and Paluga also acknowledged that the show likely changed his characterization "simply to tell an enjoyable detective story, with a Filipino folkloric flair."

Notes

References

External links
 
 

2021 Singaporean television series debuts
2021 Singaporean television series endings
Singaporean animated television series
Animated crime television series
Animated fantasy television series
Animated horror television series
Animated series based on comics
Animated web series
Anime-influenced Western animated television series
Animated television series by Netflix
English-language Netflix original programming
Filipino-language Netflix original programming
Japanese-language Netflix original programming
Philippine mythology in popular culture
Television shows based on comics
Television shows set in Metro Manila
Occult detective fiction